The American funk rock band Red Hot Chili Peppers have released over 250 songs since 1984. Formed in 1982 by vocalist Anthony Kiedis, bassist Flea, guitarist Hillel Slovak, and drummer Jack Irons, the group recorded their self-titled debut album the following year with producer Andy Gill. Recorded instead with guitarist Jack Sherman and drummer Cliff Martinez, the album introduced the band's funk metal style and served as an introduction to the band's rap rock-roots. Slovak returned to the band for the George Clinton-produced Freaky Styley (1985). Their pure funk album, its songs are noticeably influenced by Clinton and Slovak, whose guitar playing helped shape the group as a cohesive unit. The Uplift Mofo Party Plan (1987) was produced by Michael Beinhorn and featured all four founding members. It features the band's signature funk rock style, with reggae and heavy metal influences. Following Slovak's death from a drug overdose in 1988, Irons left the band, forcing Kiedis and Flea to regroup with guitarist John Frusciante and drummer Chad Smith for their next album, Mother's Milk (1989). Featuring the singles "Knock Me Down" and the Stevie Wonder-cover "Higher Ground", the album was propelled by Frusciante's guitar-playing, who altered the band's sound to a more melodic focus, and a wider range of musical styles.

Blood Sugar Sex Magik (1991), their first album produced by Rick Rubin, featured lyrics containing sexual references and innuendos, along with some discussing breakups and drug addictions. Its songs also greater emphasize melody, while not losing touch of the band's funk roots. Featuring the singles "Give It Away" and "Under the Bridge", the album propelled the band to international stardom, which led Frusciante to depart during its supporting tour. The group's follow-up, One Hot Minute (1995), recorded with former Jane's Addiction guitarist Dave Navarro, made prominent use of heavy metal guitar riffs and hints of psychedelic rock and less funk than its predecessor. Its lyrics reflected Kiedis' struggles with drug addictions at the time. Frusciante returned to the band for their next album, Californication (1999). His return changed the band's sound once again to a more alternative rock-sound, along with more pop-oriented songs ("Scar Tissue", "Otherside"). Kiedis' vocals have a more melodic sensibility, along with more varied lyrical themes including death, California, drugs, globalization, and travel. By the Way (2002) represented a departure from their signature punk-funk fusion, with a greater emphasis on harmony and texture, along with backing harmony vocals and string arrangements and more reflective lyrics. The 2006 double album Stadium Arcadium brought together musical aspects from their entire career, with Kiedis being more versatile as a vocalist, Frusciante layering his guitars, Flea varying his bass playing, and Smith being versatile on the drums. Frusciante departed the band a second time following its supporting tour.

I'm with You (2011), their first album with guitarist Josh Klinghoffer and last produced by Rubin, featured songs whose guitars were interwoven with the music itself, despite Klinghoffer's heavy-layered sound, along with piano contributions by Flea. Its lyrics deal with themes of life and death, poverty, the beginning of relationships, and the dashing of dreams and wishes. Numerous outtakes from the album, known as the I'm with You Sessions, were released as singles between 2012 and 2013, eventually being compiled on the compilation album I'm Beside You. The Getaway (2016), produced by Danger Mouse, represented a major creative musical diversity for the band, featuring songs influenced by disco, psychedelia, and their signature punk-funk sound, with lyrics reflecting heartbreak. In 2019, Klinghoffer departed the group, with Frusciante returning as guitarist. The band released two double albums in 2022, Unlimited Love and Return of the Dream Canteen, both produced by Rubin.

Songs

Notes

References

Bibliography
 
 

Red Hot Chili Peppers songs
Red Hot Chili Peppers